Jerry Sneva (May 23, 1949 – January 27, 2018) was an American race driver who drove in the USAC and CART Championship Car series. He raced in the 1977-1982 seasons, with 26 combined career starts, including the Indianapolis 500 in 1977-1980 and 1982. He was named the 1977 Indianapolis 500 Rookie of the Year.  He finished in the top ten five times, with his best finish in 4th position in 1979 at Pocono.

Jerry was the younger brother of 1983 Indianapolis 500 winner Tom Sneva. He died January 27, 2018, at the age of 68.

Indianapolis 500 results

References

1949 births
2018 deaths
Sportspeople from Spokane, Washington
Champ Car drivers
Racing drivers from Washington (state)
Indianapolis 500 drivers
Indianapolis 500 Rookies of the Year